Deng Peicheng (born 30 May 1996) is a Chinese Paralympic athlete. He won the gold medal in the men's 100 metres T36 event at the 2020 Summer Paralympics held in Tokyo, Japan. He also set a new T36 Paralympic record of 11.85 seconds.

References

Living people
1996 births
Chinese male sprinters
Paralympic medalists in athletics (track and field)
Athletes (track and field) at the 2020 Summer Paralympics
Medalists at the 2020 Summer Paralympics
Paralympic gold medalists for China
Paralympic athletes of China
Place of birth missing (living people)
21st-century Chinese people